Parhecyra is a monotypic beetle genus in the family Cerambycidae described by Stephan von Breuning in 1942. Its only species, Parhecyra costata, was described by Per Olof Christopher Aurivillius in 1908.

References

Crossotini
Beetles described in 1908
Monotypic beetle genera